Irish Hill Copse is a  biological Site of Special Scientific Interest east of Kintbury in Berkshire.

This site of coppiced ancient woodland includes an extensive area of calcareous ash/wych elm coppice on the hill sides, merging into wet ash/maple and acid oak/ash/hazel woodland with aspen, on the higher parts of the site. The lower slopes are dominated by Dog's Mercury (Mercurialis perennis), with abundant Herb Paris (Paris quadrifolia), Toothwort (Lathraea squamaria), Solomon's seal (Polygonatum multiflorum), Twayblade and Early Purple Orchids (Listera ovata) and Orchis mascula and, locally, Wild Daffodil (Narcissus pseudonarcissus).

The site is private land with no public access.

References

Sites of Special Scientific Interest in Berkshire
Sites of Special Scientific Interest notified in 1984
Forests and woodlands of Berkshire
Hamstead Marshall